The 2022–23 PBA Commissioner's Cup, also known as the 2022–23 Honda PBA Commissioner's Cup for sponsorship reasons, was the second conference of the 2022–23 PBA season of the Philippine Basketball Association (PBA). The 20th edition of the Commissioner's Cup started on September 21, 2022, and ended on January 15, 2023. The tournament allowed teams to hire foreign players or imports with a height limit of 6'10".

Several games were postponed due to the onslaught of two tropical cyclones Typhoon Karding (Noru) and Tropical Storm Paeng (Nalgae), that both affected the country.

Format
The following format will be observed for the duration of the conference: 
 Single-round robin eliminations; 12 games per team; Teams are then seeded by basis on win–loss records.
Top eight teams will advance to the quarterfinals. In case of tie, a playoff game will be held only for the #8 seed.
Quarterfinals:
QF1: #1 vs #8 (#1 twice-to-beat)
QF2: #2 vs #7 (#2 twice-to-beat)
QF3: #3 vs #6 (best-of-3 series)
QF4: #4 vs #5 (best-of-3 series)
Semifinals (best-of-5 series):
SF1: QF1 winner vs. QF4 winner
SF2: QF2 winner vs. QF3 winner
Finals (best-of-7 series)
F1: SF1 winner vs SF2 winner

Elimination round

Team standings

Schedule

Results

Eighth seed playoff

Bracket

Quarterfinals

(1) Bay Area vs. (8) Rain or Shine 
Bay Area has the twice-to-beat advantage; they have to be beaten twice, while their opponents just once, to advance.

(2) Magnolia vs. (7) Phoenix Super LPG 
Magnolia has the twice-to-beat advantage; they have to be beaten twice, while their opponents just once, to advance.

(3) Barangay Ginebra vs. (6) NorthPort 
This is a best-of-three playoff.

(4) Converge vs. (5) San Miguel 
This is a best-of-three playoff.

Semifinals
All match-ups are best-of-five playoffs.

(1) Bay Area vs. (5) San Miguel

(2) Magnolia vs. (3) Barangay Ginebra

Finals

Imports 
The following is the list of imports, which had played for their respective teams at least once, with the returning imports in italics. Highlighted are the imports who stayed with their respective teams for the whole conference.

Awards

Players of the Week

Statistics

Individual statistical leaders

Local players

Import players

Individual game highs

Local players

Import players

Team statistical leaders

Notes

References

Commissioner's Cup
PBA Commissioner's Cup